John Miller Tobin (born January 13, 1961) is an American television director and producer. As a director, Tobin has worked on the television series Oz, The Agency, Numb3rs, Terminator: The Sarah Connor Chronicles, Supernatural, 90210, Gossip Girl, Pretty Little Liars, What/If and The Vampire Diaries; on the latter of which he also served as a producer.

Tobin has directed the film How You Look to Me.  He has also worked as an assistant director on number of feature films, including Fresh (1994) and The 24 Hour Woman (1999).

References

External links
 

1961 births
Living people
American television directors
Television producers from Texas
People from Hutchinson County, Texas
Film directors from Texas